The CFA D.7 Cricri Major was a French-built light civil aircraft of the 1940s.

Development

The CFA D.7 Cricri Major was a postwar-built light high-wing monoplane with enclosed two-seat tandem glazed cabin and a fixed tail-wheel undercarriage, powered by a Salmson 5Aq-01 radial engine.

Operational history

An initial series of ten Cricri (Cricket) Majors was completed and these were bought by aero clubs and private pilots. The design was rather outdated and no further examples were completed.  Four D.7s remained in service in 1956 and one, F-BFNG remained airworthy in 1967. This aircraft has been restored to airworthiness and was operational in 2005.

Specifications

References

Notes

Bibliography

1940s French civil utility aircraft
Single-engined tractor aircraft
High-wing aircraft
Aircraft first flown in 1949